Mandelli is an Italian surname. Notable people with the surname include:

Davide Mandelli (born 1977), Italian footballer
Louis Mandelli (1833–1880), Italian zoologist and ornithologist
Mariuccia Mandelli (1925–2015), Italian fashion designer and businesswoman
Paolo Mandelli (born 1967), Italian footballer and manager

Italian-language surnames